the 2022 CAFA U-16 Championship was the 3rd edition of the CAFA U-16 Championship, the international youth football championship organized by Central Asian Football Association for the men's under-16 national teams of Central Asia. Tajikistan was hosting the tournament. Five nations competed for the title in the eight-day round-robin event, with all teams to cross paths once before the final Matchday on May 20, with players born on or after 1 January 2006 eligible to participate.

Tajikistan were the defending champions, having won the last tournament held in 2019. but failed to defend its title as they lost two to nil to the Uzbek team and were trashed out by the Iranian team seven to nil. as of IR Iran, they pulled off an improbable CAFA U16 Championship title win edging Uzbekistan out on goal difference after a stunning finale against host Tajikistan.

Participating nations
A total of 5 (out of 6) CAFA member national teams entered the tournament.

Did not enter

Venues
Matches were held at the Republic Central Stadium.

Match officials
Referees

  Seyyedali Asghar Momeni
  Nurzatbek Abdykadyrov
  Abdullo Dablatov
  Akobirkhuja Shukurllaev

Assistant referees

  Alireza Moradi
  Khusan Dzhalaldinov
  Akmal Buriev
  Ismoil Nuraliev
  Rustam Tagaev
  Aleksandr Sidorov

Squads

Main tournament 
The main tournament schedule was announced on 6 May 2022.

Player awards
The following awards were given at the conclusion of the tournament:

Goalscorers

References

External links

2022 in Asian football
Sport in Dushanbe

2022 CAFA Under-16 Championship
2022 in Tajikistani football
2022 in youth association football